Bertrand Ndongo (born c. 1990) is a Cameroonian activist for the Spanish political party Vox. He has been nicknamed in the media and in self-reference as "El Negro de Vox" (Vox's Black Guy). Since 2019, he has been a consultant to Rocío Monasterio, the party's leader in the Community of Madrid.

Biography
Ndongo's father was an educated and well-off man who worked for UNICEF. When his mother left the family due to her husband's infidelity, he was raised by relatives and at times by church institutions. While in neighbouring Gabon, he began a relationship with a Spanish missionary. Aged 20 in 2010, he moved to Spain with his pregnant partner and became a cleaner in Alcorcón, Community of Madrid, eventually rising to management. As of 2019, he is a father of three.

Ndongo joined Vox because he considered them to have forthright views that reflected his values. He supports limiting migration to Spain and closing down illegal immigration due to the risks at sea, modern slavery in Libya and the dangerous lives that undocumented people end up in on arrival in Spain.

In December 2019, Ndongo, who had built up a following on YouTube, became a consultant to Rocío Monasterio, Vox's leader in the Community of Madrid. In the same month, he criticised King Felipe VI for lacking "balls" for having made a Christmas speech in which he called for Spain not to fall into the "extremes of the past"; this reaction differed greatly from Vox's official reaction.

Also in December 2019, Ndongo made headlines for his reaction to a gang rape of a minor by players of the Arandina CF football team. He wrote on Twitter "These girls consume alcohol, smoke and upload to Instagram photos of their arses and their thongs, but when things happen later we call them minors", and said "Today I woke up with the sensation that any woman can drop my sons in the shit and ruin their lives whenever she feels like it". He also uploaded audio from the victim. In 2021, this was investigated by the Spanish Data Protection Agency (AEPD).

In February 2020, Ndongo was suspended from Twitter for video clips in which he said that left-wing women are sexually unsatisfied as they lack virile men in their lives. Nine months later, he was suspended again for spreading fake news in which he used an unrelated photograph from Algeria to implicate Arabs in the looting of a Lacoste store in Logroño.

In April 2021, Ndongo strongly criticised Vox for their threat to deport Serigné Mbayé, a Madrid deputy for Unidas Podemos who was born in Senegal and naturalised as a Spaniard.

See also
Ignacio Garriga, also nicknamed "El Negro de Vox", though not in self-reference

References

1990 births
Living people

Year of birth uncertain
Cameroonian emigrants to Spain
People from Alcorcón
Vox (political party) politicians